James Morrissey (1927 – 10 November 1997) was an Irish hurler. At club level he played with Young Irelands and St Martin's and was a three-time All-Ireland Championship winner with the Wexford senior hurling team.

Honours
Wexford
All-Ireland Senior Hurling Championship (3): 1955, 1956, 1960
Leinster Senior Hurling Championship (5): 1951, 1954, 1955, 1956, 1960
National Hurling League (2): 1955–56, 1957–58

References

1927 births
1997 deaths
St Martin's (Wexford) hurlers
Wexford inter-county hurlers
Leinster inter-provincial hurlers
All-Ireland Senior Hurling Championship winners